The men's featherweight event was part of the weightlifting programme at the 1928 Summer Olympics. The weight class was the lightest contested, and allowed weightlifters of up to 60 kilograms (132 pounds). The competition was held on Saturday, 28 July 1928.

Records
These were the standing world and Olympic records (in kilograms) prior to the 1928 Summer Olympics.

(*) Originally a five lift competition.

All four Olympic records were improved in this competition. Hans Wölpert and Giuseppe Conca in press and Franz Andrysek in clean and jerk equalized the standing world records. Pierino Gabetti and Hans Wölpert equalized the standing world record in the three lifts (total) while Franz Andrysek set a new world record with 287.5 kilograms.

Results

All figures in kilograms.

References

Sources
 Olympic Report 
 

Featherweight